The 1934 United States Senate election in Indiana took place on November 6, 1934. Incumbent Republican U.S. Senator Arthur Robinson ran for re-election to a second term, but lost narrowly to Democrat Sherman Minton.

General election

Candidates
 Albert W. Jackman (Prohibition)
Sherman Minton, Indiana Utility Commissioner (Democratic)
Arthur Raymond Robinson, incumbent Senator since 1925 (Republican)
Wenzel Stocker (Communist)
 Forrest Wallace (Socialist)

Results

See also 
 1934 United States Senate elections

References

Indiana
1934
1934 Indiana elections